List of plant species in the genus Hippeastrum.

List
, the World Checklist of Selected Plant Families accepts 91 species of the genus Hippeastrum: Garcia et al (2019) estimate approximately 100 species in subgenus Hippeastrum, together with 3 in subgenus Tocantinia.

Subgenus Hippeastrum

Hippeastrum aglaiae (A.Cast.) Hunz. & A.A.Cocucci
Hippeastrum amaru (Vargas) Meerow
Hippeastrum andreanum Baker
Hippeastrum angustifolium Pax
Hippeastrum anzaldoi (Cárdenas) Van Scheepen
Hippeastrum apertispathum (Traub) H.E.Moore
Hippeastrum arboricola (Ravenna) Meerow
Hippeastrum argentinum (Pax) Hunz.
Hippeastrum aulicum (Ker Gawl.) Herb.
Hippeastrum aviflorum (Ravenna) Dutilh
Hippeastrum blossfeldiae (Traub & J.L.Doran) Van Scheepen
Hippeastrum brasilianum (Traub & J.L.Doran) Dutilh
Hippeastrum breviflorum Herb.
Hippeastrum bukasovii (Vargas) Gereau & Brako
Hippeastrum caiaponicum (Ravenna) Dutilh
Hippeastrum calyptratum (Ker Gawl.) Herb.
Hippeastrum canterai Arechav.
Hippeastrum caupolicanense (Cárdenas) Van Scheepen
Hippeastrum chionedyanthum (Cárdenas) Van Scheepen
Hippeastrum condemaitae (Vargas & E.Pérez) Meerow
Hippeastrum correiense (Bury) Worsley
Hippeastrum crociflorum Rusby
Hippeastrum curitibanum (Ravenna) Dutilh
Hippeastrum cuzcoense (Vargas) Gereau & Brako
Hippeastrum cybister (Herb.) Benth. ex Baker
Hippeastrum damazianum Beauverd
Hippeastrum divijulianum (Cárdenas) Meerow
Hippeastrum doraniae (Traub) Meerow
Hippeastrum elegans (Spreng.) H.E.Moore
Hippeastrum escobaruriae (Cárdenas) Van Scheepen
Hippeastrum espiritense (Traub) H.E.Moore
Hippeastrum evansiae (Traub & I.S.Nelson) H.E.Moore
Hippeastrum ferreyrae (Traub) Gereau & Brako
Hippeastrum forgetii Worsley
Hippeastrum fragrantissimum (Cárdenas) Meerow
Hippeastrum fuscum Kraenzl.
Hippeastrum gertianum (Ravenna) Dutilh
Hippeastrum glaucescens (Mart. ex Schult. & Schult.f.) Herb.
Hippeastrum goianum (Ravenna) Meerow
Hippeastrum guarapuavicum (Ravenna) Van Scheepen
Hippeastrum harrisonii (Lindl.) Hook.f.
Hippeastrum hemographes (Ravenna) Dutilh
Hippeastrum hugoi (Vargas) Gereau & Brako
Hippeastrum iguazuanum (Ravenna) T.R.Dudley & M.Williams
Hippeastrum incachacanum (Cárdenas) Van Scheepen
Hippeastrum intiflorum (Vargas) Gereau & Brako
Hippeastrum kromeri (Worsley) Meerow
Hippeastrum lapacense (Cárdenas) Van Scheepen
Hippeastrum leonardii (Vargas) Gereau & Brako
Hippeastrum leopoldii T.Moore
Hippeastrum leucobasis (Ravenna) Dutilh
Hippeastrum macbridei (Vargas) Gereau & Brako
Hippeastrum machupijchense (Vargas) D.R.Hunt
Hippeastrum mandonii Baker
Hippeastrum maracasum (Traub) H.E.Moore
Hippeastrum marumbiense (Ravenna) Van Scheepen
Hippeastrum miniatum (Ruiz & Pav.) Herb.
Hippeastrum mollevillquense (Cárdenas) Van Scheepen
Hippeastrum monanthum (Ravenna) Meerow
Hippeastrum morelianum Lem.
Hippeastrum nelsonii (Cárdenas) Van Scheepen
Hippeastrum oconequense (Traub) H.E.Moore
Hippeastrum papilio (Ravenna) Van Scheepen
Hippeastrum paquichanum (Cárdenas) Dutilh
Hippeastrum paradisiacum (Ravenna) Meerow
Hippeastrum paranaense (Traub) Meerow
Hippeastrum pardinum (Hook.f.) Dombrain
Hippeastrum parodii Hunz. & A.A.Cocucci
Hippeastrum petiolatum Pax
Hippeastrum pilcomaicum (Ravenna) Meerow
Hippeastrum psittacinum (Ker Gawl.) Herb.
Hippeastrum puniceum (Lam.) Voss. Syn. H. equestre (Aiton)
Hippeastrum reginae (L.) Herb.
Hippeastrum reticulatum (L'Hér.) Herb. Syn H. striatifolium (Sims)
Hippeastrum rubropictum (Ravenna) Meerow
Hippeastrum santacatarina (Traub) Dutilh
Hippeastrum scopulorum Baker
Hippeastrum starkiorum (I.S.Nelson & Traub) Van Scheepen
Hippeastrum striatum (Lam.) H.E.Moore
Hippeastrum stylosum Herb.
Hippeastrum teyucuarense (Ravenna) Van Scheepen
Hippeastrum traubii (Moldenke) H.E.Moore
Hippeastrum umabisanum (Cárdenas) Meerow
Hippeastrum vanleestenii (Traub) H.E.Moore
Hippeastrum variegatum (Vargas) Gereau & Brako
Hippeastrum viridiflorum Rusby
Hippeastrum vittatum (L'Hér.) Herb.
Hippeastrum wilsoniae L.J.Doran & F.W.Mey.
Hippeastrum yungacense (Cárdenas & I.S.Nelson) Meerow

Subgenus Toccatinia
 Hippeastrum mirum (Ravenna) Christenh. & Byng (type)
 Hippeastrum stigmatovittatum (Büneker & al.) Christenh. & Byng
 Hippeastrum dutilhianum (Büneker & al.) Christenh. & Byng 

Unplaced names include Hippeastrum ugentii, considered in the Kew World Checklist of Selected Plant Families as probably a Crinum.

References

List
Hippeastrum